Tauranga is a coastal city in the Bay of Plenty Region and the fifth most populous city of New Zealand, with an urban population of , or roughly 3% of the national population. It was settled by Māori late in the 13th century, colonised by Europeans in the early 19th century, and was constituted as a city in 1963.

The city lies in the north-western corner of the Bay of Plenty, on the south-eastern edge of Tauranga Harbour.

Tauranga is one of New Zealand's main centres for business, international trade, culture, fashion and horticultural science. The Port of Tauranga is New Zealand's largest port in terms of gross export tonnage and efficiency. Tauranga is one of New Zealand's fastest-growing cities, with an 11% increase in population between the 2006 census and the 2013 census, and 19% between the 2013 and 2018 census. Due to its rapid population growth, Tauranga has become New Zealand's fifth-largest city, overtaking Dunedin and the Napier-Hastings urban areas.

History

Settlement
The earliest known settlers were Māori, who arrived in the 13th century at Tauranga in the Tākitimu and the Mātaatua waka.

At 9 am on Friday, 23 June 1826,  was the first European ship to enter Tauranga Harbour. The Revd. Henry Williams conducted a Christian service at Otamataha Pā.

In December 1826 and again in March 1827, the Herald travelled to Tauranga from the Bay of Islands to obtain supplies of potatoes, pigs and flax. In 1835 a Church Missionary Society mission station was established at Tauranga by William Wade. Rev. Alfred N. Brown arrived at the CMS mission station in 1838. John Morgan also visited the mission in 1838.

Europeans trading in flax were active in the Bay of Plenty during the 1830s; some were transient, others married local women and settled permanently. The first permanent non-Maori trader was James Farrow, who travelled to Tauranga in 1829, obtaining flax fibre for Australian merchants in exchange for muskets and gunpowder.

In 1840, a Catholic mission station was established. Bishop Pompallier was given land within the palisades of Otūmoetai Pā for a church and a presbytery. The mission station closed in 1863 due to land wars in the Waikato district.

New Zealand Wars–Tauranga Campaign
The Tauranga Campaign took place in and around Tauranga from 21 January to 21 June 1864, during the New Zealand Wars. The Battle of Gate Pa is the best known.

The Battle of Gate Pā was an attack on the well fortified Pā and its Māori defenders on 29 April 1864 by British forces made up of approximately 300 men of the 43rd Regiment and a naval contingent. The British casualties were 31 dead (including 10 officers), and 80 wounded - the single most devastating loss of life suffered by the British military in the whole of the New Zealand Wars.  The Māori defenders abandoned the Pā during the night with casualties estimated at 25 dead and an unknown number of wounded.

Fires
In November 1916, a large fire broke out at the strand destroying 12 buildings, including the Commercial Hotel.

In 1936 another large fire occurred which started in the hotel's staff quarters and drew large crowds.

Modern era
Under the Local Government (Tauranga City Council) Order 2003, Tauranga became legally a city for a second time, from 1 March 2004.

In August 2011, Tauranga received Ultra-Fast Broadband as part of the New Zealand Government's rollout.

Geography
Tauranga is located around a large harbour that extends along the western Bay of Plenty, and is protected by Matakana Island and the extinct volcano of Mauao (Mount Maunganui). Ngamuwahine River is located 19 kilometres southwest of Tauranga.

Tauranga and the Bay of Plenty are situated along a faultline and so experience (infrequent) seismic activity. There are a few volcanoes around the area (mainly dormant). The most notable of these are White Island and Mauao, nicknamed "The Mount" by locals.

Tauranga is roughly the antipode of Jaén, Spain.

Here is a list of suburbs by electoral ward:

Te Papa / Welcome Bay:
 Gate Pa
 Greerton
 Hairini
 Maungatapu
 Merivale
 Poike
 Tauranga CBD
 Tauranga South
 Welcome Bay

Otumoetai / Pyes Pa:
 Bellevue
 Bethlehem
 Brookfield
 Judea
 Matua
 Omanawa
 Otūmoetai
 Pyes Pa
 Tauriko
 The Lakes Village

Mount Maunganui / Papamoa:
 Arataki
 Kairua
 Matapihi
 Mount Maunganui
 Moturiki Island
 Omanu
 Papamoa Beach
 Waitao

Others:
 Motuopuhi Island (Rat Island)
 Motuotau Island
 Ohauiti
 Waikareao Estuary

Climate
Tauranga has an oceanic or maritime temperate climate. It can also be described as subtropical.

During the summer months the population swells as holidaymakers descend on the city, especially along the popular white coastal surf beaches from Mount Maunganui to Papamoa.

Demographics
In 1976 Tauranga was a medium-sized urban area with a population of around 48,000. However, the completion of a harbour bridge in 1988 brought Tauranga and The Mount closer (they amalgamated in 1989) and re-energised the economies of both parts of the enlarged city.
By 1996 Tauranga's population had grown to 82,092 and by 2006 it had reached 103,635.

In 2008 Tauranga overtook Dunedin to become the sixth-largest city in New Zealand by urban area, and the ninth largest city by Territorial Authority area. With continuing growth it has now surpassed the Napier-Hastings area to become New Zealand's fifth-largest city.

Tauranga City had a population of 136,713 at the 2018 New Zealand census, an increase of 21,924 people (19.1%) since the 2013 census, and an increase of 32,832 people (31.6%) since the 2006 census. There were 50,442 households, comprising 65,868 males and 70,845 females, giving a sex ratio of 0.93 males per female. The median age was 40.4 years (compared with 37.4 years nationally), with 27,564 people (20.2%) aged under 15 years, 23,235 (17.0%) aged 15 to 29, 58,938 (43.1%) aged 30 to 64, and 26,979 (19.7%) aged 65 or older.

Ethnicities were 81.7% European/Pākehā, 18.2% Māori, 2.9% Pacific peoples, 7.6% Asian, and 2.1% other ethnicities. People may identify with more than one ethnicity.

The percentage of people born overseas was 21.7, compared with 27.1% nationally.

Although some people chose not to answer the census's question about religious affiliation, 50.8% had no religion, 35.5% were Christian, 2.1% had Māori religious beliefs, 1.0% were Hindu, 0.3% were Muslim, 0.5% were Buddhist and 3.1% had other religions.

Of those at least 15 years old, 21,570 (19.8%) people had a bachelor's or higher degree, and 18,957 (17.4%) people had no formal qualifications. The median income was $31,600, compared with $31,800 nationally. 17,493 people (16.0%) earned over $70,000 compared to 17.2% nationally. The employment status of those at least 15 was that 51,591 (47.3%) people were employed full-time, 16,233 (14.9%) were part-time, and 3,753 (3.4%) were unemployed.

The city hosts five major head offices – Port of Tauranga, Zespri International, Ballance Agri-Nutrients Ltd, Trustpower and Craigs Investment Partners (formerly, ABN AMRO Craigs).

Government and politics
Tauranga is located in the administrative area of the Tauranga City Council. The council consists of ten councillors and a mayor. Four councillors are elected by the city at large; the remainder are elected from three wards (constituencies), with each ward electing two councillors:
 Te Papa / Welcome Bay
 Otūmoetai / Pyes Pa
 Mount Maunganui / Papamoa

Council elections are held every three years, most recently in 2019. In December 2020, the Minister of Local Government Nanaia Mahuta announced that, due to dysfunction within the elected council, the council would be replaced by commissioners until the 2022 local elections. However, then Tauranga MP Simon Bridges said the appointment of commissioners was unnecessary and a "dramatic and draconian step."

For elections to the New Zealand Parliament, the city of Tauranga is in the Tauranga and Bay of Plenty electorates.

Economy
Much of the countryside surrounding Tauranga is horticultural land, used to grow a wide range of fresh produce for both domestic consumption and export. There are many kiwifruit and avocados orchards as well as other crops.

The Port of Tauranga is New Zealand's largest export port. It is a regular stop for both container ships and luxury cruise liners.

Tauranga's main shopping malls are Bayfair, in Mount Maunganui and Tauranga Crossing in Tauriko. Most of the city's shopping centres are located in the suburbs. They include Fraser Cove, Tauranga Crossing, Bethlehem Town Centre, Papamoa Plaza, Fashion Island, Bayfair Shopping Centre, Bay Central and Greerton Village.

Tauranga has the following business innovation centres

 The Kollective
 Newnham Park

The following companies have their head office in Tauranga:
 Ballance Agri-Nutrients
 Brother NZ
 C3 Limited
 Craigs Investment Partners Ltd
 Dominion Salt 
 Genera Biosecurity
 Kiwi Bus Builders
 Port of Tauranga
 Shuzi New Zealand Limited
 Tidy International
 Trimax Mowing Systems 
 TrustPower
 UNO. Magazine
 Zespri International

Arts and culture

Religion
A wide variety of faiths are practised, including Christianity, Hinduism, Buddhism, Islam, Sikhism, Taoism and Judaism. There are many denominations of Christianity including Pentecostal, Methodist, Presbyterian, Roman Catholic, Exclusive Brethren, Baptist, The Church of Jesus Christ of Latter-day Saints (LDS Church) and Jacobite Syrian Christian Church.

Music
The National Jazz Festival takes place in Tauranga every Easter.

Events
New Year celebrations at the Mount in Mount Maunganui are one of Tauranga's main events, bringing people from all around the country.

In 2014 Tauranga City Council granted permission for an annual Sikh parade to celebrate Guru Gobind Singh's birthday. 2500 people took part in 2014, while in 2015, the number increased to 3500.

Sports

Tauranga has a large stadium complex in the Mount Manganui suburb, Baypark Stadium, rebuilt in 2001 after a similar complex closed in 1995. It hosts Speedway events during summer and rugby matches in winter.

Tauranga is also the home of football (soccer) club Tauranga City United who compete in the Lotto Sport Italia NRFL Division 2.

Tauranga is the home to two rowing clubs – Tauranga Rowing Club in Memorial Park and Bay of Plenty Coast Rowing Club at the picturesque Wairoa River.  Both clubs have had successful NZ representation over the years.

Tauranga has an all weather outdoor athletics ground at Tauranga Domain.

City facilities and attractions

Greater Tauranga is a very popular lifestyle and tourism destination. It features many natural attractions and scenery ranging from popular beaches and harbour environments to lush bush-clad mountains with waterfalls and lakes.

Cultural attractions include the Tauranga Art Gallery, which opened in October 2007 and showcases local, national and international exhibitions in a range of media. On the 17th Avenue, the "Historic Village on 17th", recreates a historic setting with original and replica buildings from early Tauranga housing arts and gift shops.

Aviation interests are well served with the Classic Flyers Museum and the Gyrate Flying Club where you can experience flying a modern gyroplane; the "motorbike of the sky".

Tauranga has many parks: one of the largest is Memorial Park, and others include Yatton Park, Kulim Park, Fergusson Park and the large Tauranga Domain. The Te Puna Quarry Park has become a regional attraction, known for being converted from a disused quarry into a community park.

Due to the temperate climate, outdoor activities are very popular, including golf, tramping (hiking), mountain biking and white water rafting.  The Bay of Plenty coastline has miles of golden sandy beaches, and watersports are very popular, including swimming, surfing, fishing, diving, kayaking and kitesurfing.  Tourists also enjoy dolphin-watching on specially run boat trips.

The coastal suburb Papamoa and neighbouring town Mount Maunganui are some of the more affluent areas around Tauranga. The region's beaches attract swimmers, surfers, kayakers and kitesurfers throughout the year.

Tauranga has many outlying islands and reefs that make it a notable tourist destination point for travelling scuba divers and marine enthusiasts. Extensive marine life diversity is available to scuba divers all year round. Water temperatures range from 12 degrees Celsius in winter to 22–24 degrees Celsius in summer. Tauranga houses two professional dive instructor training centres, training NAUI, PADI and SSI dive leader systems.

Infrastructure

Hospitals
Tauranga Hospital is a public secondary regional hospital located in Tauranga South, with 360 beds including neonatal, geriatric, surgical, maternity and mental health care. It provides elective and emergency healthcare across medical, surgical, paediatric, obstetric, gynaecological and psychiatric services. The main tertiary referral centre for Tauranga Hospital is Waikato Hospital, located in Hamilton. As the site of the Bay of Plenty Clinical School, Tauranga Hospital provides training to medical students from the University of Auckland, as well as selective and elective placements for nursing and midwifery students.

Grace Hospital is Tauranga's only private specialist surgical hospital, located in Oropi. It accommodates 6 operating theatres, 48 impatient beds, a two-bed HDU, a procedure room for minor surgery and two procedure rooms for endoscopy.

Utilities
Powerco operates the local distribution network in the city, with electricity supplied from Transpower's national grid at three substations: Tauranga (Greerton), Kaitemako and Mount Maunganui (Matapihi).

Natural gas arrived in Tauranga in 1982, following the completion of the high-pressure pipeline from the Maui pipeline near Te Awamutu to the city, now operated by First Gas. First Gas also operates the gas distribution network within the city.

Transport
Tauranga City Council is currently responsible for approximately 530 km of roads, 700 km of footpaths, cycle ways and access ways.

Tauranga City Council also has a bit of work under way with their Transportation and Roads strategy. Their aim for the future to change current travel behaviour from a focus on private cars to more sustainable modes such as buses, cycling and walking.

Air
Tauranga Airport is served by Air New Zealand with flights to Auckland, Wellington and Christchurch. Sunair is based in Tauranga, operating a fleet of light aircraft. Sunair operates from Tauranga Airport to Whangarei, Claris, Whitanga and Motiti Island. Barrier Air also operates from Tauranga to Great Barrier Island.

Rail
 Tauranga is located on the East Coast Main Trunk Railway.

Bus
Main transportation in the city is provided by the BayBus, with twelve routes servicing the city's population. Bay Hopper buses depart the central stops in Tauranga's CBD, Ohauiti, Mount Maunganui and Bayfair every 15 minutes, with the routes to Papamoa and Greerton half-hourly. Bee cards were introduced for fares on 27 July 2020.

The city is also a waypoint for bus travel between cities, with the Bay Hopper, and Intercity having a daily schedule.

Education

Tauranga is home to the Bay of Plenty Tertiary Education Partnership, made up of:

 Toi Ohomai Institute of Technology, Te Whare Wānanga o Awanuiārangi
 The University of Waikato
 Te Whare Wānanga o Awanuiārangi

The organisations currently share two main campuses, but are planning a new central campus. Stage 1 is expected to be open in 2017, catering for 500 but with capacity for 700, which will cost $67.3 Million.

Tauranga's secondary schools are:
 Tauranga Boys' College, with about 1850 boys.
 Tauranga Girls' College, with over 1500 girls.
 Otumoetai College, with around 1900 students.
 Bethlehem College, a state integrated Christian school offering kindergarten and Year 1–13, with around 1500 students.
 Aquinas College a state integrated coeducational Catholic school founded in 2003 for Years 7–13, with around 800 students.
 Mount Maunganui College, a co-educational secondary school, with over 1500 students.
 Papamoa College, co-educational secondary school opened in 2011 for years 7 – 13.
 Te Wharekura o Mauao, a co-educational wharekura-ā-iwi total immersion Māori secondary school for Years 7–13, founded in 2010, with around 200 students.
 Te Kura Kaupapa Māori o Te Kura Kōkiri, a co-educational kura kaupapa Māori total immersion school for Years 1–13, founded in 2000, with around 140 students.

ACG Tauranga, the city's first fully private school, offers school to Year 12.

There is also a Rudolf Steiner School in Welcome Bay, catering for birth to 12-year-olds.

Notable residents
 Corey Anderson – international cricketer
 Trent Boult – international cricketer
 Tyler Boyd – footballer
 Peter Burling – America's Cup helmsman and Olympic medallist
 Sam Cane – international rugby player
 Bob Clarkson – former Member of Parliament and property developer
 Dame Lynley Dodd – award-winning author and illustrator, principally known for her children's picture books featuring Hairy Maclary and his friends
 Mahé Drysdale – Olympic rower
 Tim Balme – actor, director
 John Bracewell – international cricketer
 Simon Bridges – MP for Tauranga; former Leader of the New Zealand National Party
 Moss Burmester – Olympic swimmer
 Tony Christiansen – former Paralympics, FESPIC Games and World Games medallist, professional speaker and Tauranga City Councillor
 Aaron de Mey –  makeup artist
 Dame Susan Devoy – former World Squash Champion
 Daniel Flynn – international cricketer
 Hilda Hewlett – pioneer aviator
 Gunnar Jackson – professional middleweight boxer
 Jess Johnson – artist
 Tanerau Latimer – former international rugby player
 Tony Lochhead – footballer
 Ny Oh - folk musician
Todd Muller – MP for Bay of Plenty; former Leader of the New Zealand National Party
 Richard O'Brien – author of The Rocky Horror Show (spent his formative years here)
 Phil Rudd – drummer for AC/DC
 Andrew Stevenson – Olympic rower, Double World Champion Rower, NZ 1982 Sportsman of the Year
 Sir Gordon Tietjens – Coach of the New Zealand national rugby sevens team
 Kane Williamson – international cricketer

Past residents
 Kathleen Hawkins – known as the "Pioneer Poet"
 Les Munro – Dambusters veteran
 Winston Peters – former MP for Tauranga, leader of NZ First, politician
 Stan Walker – R&B singer, Former Australian Idol contestant and winner

Sister cities
Tauranga is twinned with:
Hitachi, Japan
San Bernardino, United States
Yantai, China

References

External links

 Tauranga City Council

 
 
Main urban areas in New Zealand
Territorial authorities of New Zealand
Port cities in New Zealand